Pagyda pulvereiumbralis is a moth in the family Crambidae. It was described by George Hampson in 1918. It is found in Ethiopia, Kenya, Namibia, Uganda, and on Réunion, Madagascar and Mauritius.

References

Moths described in 1918
Pyraustinae
Moths of Africa